Pleasant Hill, Arkansas may refer to the following places in the U.S. state of Arkansas:
Pleasant Hill, Conway County, Arkansas
Pleasant Hill, Crawford County, Arkansas
Pleasant Hill, Cross County, Arkansas
Pleasant Hill, Garland County, Arkansas
Pleasant Hill, Independence County, Arkansas
Pleasant Hill (north), Logan County, Arkansas
Pleasant Hill (south), Logan County, Arkansas
Pleasant Hill, Miller County, Arkansas
Pleasant Hill, Nevada County, Arkansas
Pleasant Hill, Newton County, Arkansas
Pleasant Hill, Polk County, Arkansas
Pleasant Hill, Saline County, Arkansas
Pleasant Hill, Scott County, Arkansas
Pleasant Hill, Stone County, Arkansas
Pleasant Hill, Yell County, Arkansas